Rumpole and the Golden Thread is a 1983 collection of short stories by John Mortimer about defence barrister Horace Rumpole. They were adapted from his scripts for the TV series of the same name.
The stories were:

"Rumpole and the Female of the Species"
"Rumpole and the Genuine Article"
"Rumpole and the Golden Thread"
"Rumpole and the Last Resort"
"Rumpole and the Old Boy Net"
"Rumpole and the Sporting Life"

References

Works by John Mortimer
1983 short story collections